Carlos Llavador Fernández (born 26 April 1992, Madrid) is a Spanish foil fencer. He won the silver medal in the men's individual foil event at the 2022 Mediterranean Games held in Oran, Algeria.

Career
His first major result was a bronze medal at the U23 European Championships in Vincenza in April 2015. He was the only Spanish foilist to take part in the 2015 European Championships in Montreux. No.136 in senior rankings, he created a surprise by reaching the semifinals after prevailing over Britain's Richard Kruse. He then lost to Andrea Cassarà and came away with a bronze medal. A resident of Sala de Armas de Madrid, he will train in the 2015–16 season with Frascati Scherma along with Montreux silver medallist Daniele Garozzo.

References

External links
Profile at the European Fencing Confederation

Spanish male foil fencers
1992 births
Living people
Fencers from Madrid
World Fencing Championships medalists
Fencers at the 2020 Summer Olympics
Olympic fencers of Spain
Mediterranean Games silver medalists for Spain
Competitors at the 2022 Mediterranean Games
Mediterranean Games medalists in fencing
20th-century Spanish people
21st-century Spanish people